Pamela Winslow is an actress who appeared in film and television roles in the early 1990s. She was the original Rapunzel in the Sondheim-Lapine musical, Into the Woods.

Early life
She is originally from Maplewood, New Jersey, where she attended Columbia High School. Winslow later received a BFA in Acting/Musical Theatre at Carnegie Mellon University.

Broadway credits
Beauty and the Beast, as Babette (Replacement)
Meet Me in St. Louis (1990), as Lucille (Replacement)
Into the Woods (1987-1989), as Rapunzel (U/S Cinderella, Florinda, and Lucinda)
Into the Woods (1997) as Rapunzel

Filmography
 Steal Big Steal Little (1995), as Melanie
 Little Sister (1992), as The Girl
 Passionata (1992), as Liana Buckman
 Into the Woods (1991), as Rapunzel
 Star Trek: The Next Generation
 Ensign McKnight in "Clues", "In Theory", and "Face of the Enemy"
 They Came from Outer Space
 Cindy in "Look Who's Barking"

References

External links
 
 
 Pamela Winslow Kashani- Official Site

American film actresses
American musical theatre actresses
American television actresses
Carnegie Mellon University College of Fine Arts alumni
Year of birth missing (living people)
Living people
Place of birth missing (living people)